The Norton Model 77 Dominator was a 600 cc  vertical twin motorcycle manufactured by the Norton Motorcycle Company from 1956 to 1958. It was based on the Model 7 that it superseded, and was primarily intended for sidecar use. Norton modified the featherbed frame of the 88 and 99 models in 1957 to be suitable for sidecar use making the Model 77  superfluous and the model was dropped in 1958.

Technical details

Engine
Based on the 1949 Bert Hopwood designed 500 cc twin engine, the engine had been enlarged to 600 cc by enlarging the 500's bore and stroke of  x  to  x . The same engine was used in the 99 Dominator.

Cycle parts
The 77 used the same cycle parts as the previous Model 7, which was also used on the ES2. The single downtube frame was made of tubes and brazed lugs. Front forks were Norton's roadholders.

References

External links
 
 Journey To Pakistan on a Norton 77

Norton motorcycles
Motorcycles introduced in 1956
Motorcycles powered by straight-twin engines